Ivi Adamou is a Greek Cypriot singer. Until 2013, she was signed to the Sony Music record label after her participation in the second season of The X Factor. In June 2010, Adamou released her debut album, an extended play named Kalokairi Stin Kardia that included her first single "A*G*A*P*I". The album was certified gold for selling over 60,000 copies. Her second extended play, Christmas with Ivi Adamou, was certified double platinum in Portugal for selling over 50,000 copies. Her first studio album San Ena Oniro was released in July 2011 and peaked at the 17th place in the Greek album charts. Her single "La La Love" became a success after competing in the Eurovision Song Contest 2012 and was charted in the European countries including Sweden, Spain and the United Kingdom.

Adamou had several nominations at the MAD Video Music Awards since 2011. She won two awards, for the best video clip urban and the best Cypriot artist. She was also nominated three years in a row at the Madame Figaro Awards for the best Cypriot woman singer and won two of them, in 2010 and 2012. In 2013, "Time to Love" won a web award for the best song of the year. In 2015, she was nominated in the Golden Edition of the Big Apple Music Awards.

Eurodanceweb Award 
The Eurodanceweb Award is an online competition dedicated to dance music, created in 2001 by an idea of a group of Italian and Maltese disc jockeys. Main purpose of this project is the promotion of dance songs from all over Europe and the Mediterranean Basin, with strong links to their National language and culture. Adamou did not receive any award out of the one nomination.

Eurovision Radio Awards 
The Eurovision Radio Awards is a web award held by the Eurovision radio. It honors songs and artists of the respective Eurovision year contest. Adamou has not received any awards out of the two nominations.

Eurovision Song Contest

The Eurovision Song Contest is an annual competition held among active member countries of the EBU. The contest, which has been broadcast every year since its debut in 1956, is one of the longest-running television programs and most watched in the world. Adamou represented Cyprus in the 2012 contest.

MAD Video Music Awards 
The MAD Video Music Awards is an annual awards show that air on MAD TV. The awards honor the year's biggest achievements in music, voted by the viewers of Mad television. Adamou has received two awards out of 16 nominations.

Madame Figaro Awards 
The Madame Figaro Awards is an annual Cypriot awards show and honors women of Cyprus in different categories such as music and politics. Adamou has received three awards out of four nominations.

Super Music Awards
The Super Music Awards is an annual Cypriot music awards show held by the radio station Super FM. Adamou has not received any awards out of the two nominations.

Rankings

References 

Awards and nominations
Adamou, Ivi